are a set of 863 Chinese characters known as "name kanji" in English. They are a supplementary list of characters that can legally be used in registered personal names in Japan, despite not being in the official list of "commonly used characters" (jōyō kanji). "Jinmeiyō kanji" is sometimes used to refer to the characters in both the jinmeiyō and jōyō lists.

A ministerial decree of 1946 limited the number of officially sanctioned kanji for public use to the 1,850 tōyō kanji. Only kanji on this list were acceptable as registered names, despite the fact that the list excluded many kanji frequently used in names up to that point. However, on May 25, 1951, the cabinet extended the set of characters usable in names by specifying the first 90 jinmeiyō kanji.

Over the years, the Minister of Justice has increased the number of name kanji, and has a plan for further addition in response to requests from parents. As of April 30, 2009, there were 985 jinmeiyō kanji, but this number was reduced to 861 in late 2010 when 129 jinmeiyō characters were transferred to the jōyō kanji list, and 5 characters were transferred from the jōyō kanji list to jinmeiyō characters. In 2015 and 2017, 2 kanji in total were added to the jinmeiyō list, making the total number 863.

In Japan, name kanji are taught at the junior-high level.

History
Below is a list of changes made to the jinmeiyō kanji list since its creation in 1951.

May 25, 1951
The first 92 characters of jinmeiyō kanji were published:
丑　丞　乃　之　也　亘　亥　亦　亨　亮　伊　匡　卯　只　吾　呂　哉　嘉　圭　奈　宏　寅　巌　巳　庄　弘　弥　彦　悌　敦　昌　晃　晋　智　暢　朋　桂　桐　楠　橘　欣　欽　毅　浩　淳　熊　爾　猪　玲　琢　瑞　睦　磯　祐　禄　禎　稔　穣　綾　惣　聡　肇　胤　艶　蔦　藤　蘭　虎　蝶　輔　辰　郁　酉　錦　鎌　靖　須　馨　駒　鯉　鯛　鶴　鹿　麿　亀
Fourteen of them were later transferred to the jōyō kanji: 
仙　尚　杉　甚　磨　斉　龍　亀*　熊*　弥*　艶*　鹿*　鎌*　駒*　虎*

Kanji that are marked with a asterisk were probably added later, for example, in 1981, when Jōyō kanji started, or in the 2010 change to Jōyō kanji.

July 30, 1976
28 kanji were added, for a total of 120 characters.

佑　允　冴　喬　怜　旭　杏　梓　梢　梨　沙　渚　瑠　瞳　紗　紘　絢　翠　耶　芙　茜　藍　那　阿　隼　鮎　葵

One was later transferred to the jōyō kanji: .

October 1, 1981
Introduction of the jōyō kanji list, which includes the 14* characters mentioned above; those 14* (including  梨⁠* are thus removed from the jinmeiyō kanji list.
54 other characters are added for a total of 166 name characters.

伍　伶　侑　尭　孟　峻　嵩　嶺　巴　彬　惇　惟　慧　斐　旦　昂　李　栗　楓　槙　汐　洵　洸　渥　瑛　瑶　璃　甫　皓　眸　矩　碧　笹　緋　翔　脩　苑　茉　莉　萌　萩　蓉　蕗　虹　諒　赳　迪　遥　遼　霞　頌　駿　鳩　鷹

March 1, 1990
118 kanji were added for a total of 284 characters.

伎　伽　侃　倖　倭　偲　冶　凌　凜　凪　捺　於　旺　昴　晏　晟　晨　暉　曙　朔　凱　勁　叡　叶　唄　啄　奎　媛　嬉　宥　崚　嵐　嵯　巽　彗　彪　恕　憧　拳　捷　杜　柊　柚　柾　栞　梧　椋　椎　椰　椿　楊　榛　槻　樺　檀　毬　汀　汰　洲　湧　滉　漱　澪　熙　燎　燦　燿　爽　玖　琳　瑚　瑳　皐　眉　瞭　碩　秦　稀　稜　竣　笙　紬　絃　綜　綸　綺　耀　胡　舜　芹　茄　茅　莞　菖　菫　蒔　蒼　蓮　蕉　衿　袈　裟　詢　誼　諄　邑　醇　采　雛　鞠　颯　魁　鳳　鴻　鵬　麟　黎　黛

December 3, 1997
1 kanji was added, for a total of 285 characters.

琉

February 23, 2004
1 kanji was added, for a total of 286 characters.

曽

June 7, 2004
1 kanji was added, for a total of 287 characters.

獅

June 11, 2004
No addition to the jinmeiyō kanji was made on this date. However, a plan for 578 additions was put forward to the council on jinmeiyō kanji of the legislative council of the Ministry of Justice. The list included certain characters in strong demand by parents for use in their children's names, such as:
  (ichigo, "strawberry")
  (haruka, "distant", traditional variant)
  (akira, "scintillating")
  (kiba, "fang")

Many others were included not for their potential uses in names (as is noted), but rather because of their frequent use and being easy to read and write. Examples include:

  (kuso, "excrement")
  (noroi, "curse")
  (shikabane, "corpse")
  (gan,  "cancer")

At this same council, the decision was made to call for suggestions on characters to be included or excluded via the Ministry of Justice website, until July 9, 2004.

July 12, 2004
3 kanji were added, for a total of 290 characters.

毘　瀧　駕

July 23, 2004
No additions were made. After sharp protests, the council decided to withdraw nine characters from the 489 whose inclusion had been discussed. These nine characters were:
  (kuso, "excrement")
  (noroi, "curse")
  (shikabane, "corpse")
  (gan,  "cancer")
  (kan, "rape, seduction")
  (midara, "obscene")
  (urami, "resentment")
  (ji, "hemorrhoids")
  (mekake,  "concubine")

The 480 other characters still remained under consideration for inclusion, with one additional character added to them, namely  (kiku, "to draw up water with one's hands").

September 27, 2004
484 characters and variant forms of 209 jōyō kanji were added, bringing the total number of the jinmeiyō kanji to 983.

April 30, 2009
2 more characters were added for a total number of 985 characters.

祷　穹

November 30, 2010
In late 2010, the Japanese government added 196 characters to the jōyō kanji list. The list now includes 129 characters previously classified as jinmeiyō kanji, 11 of which are currently used in Japanese prefectures or nearby countries:

At the same time, 5 characters deleted from the jōyō kanji list were added to the jinmeiyō kanji list, making the total number of jinmeiyō kanji 861:
 (shaku (しゃく), an old unit of measure approx. 18ml in volume, or 0.033m² in area)
 (sui or tsumu (つむ/すい), a spindle or weight)
 (sen (せん), pig iron)
 (chō or fuku[reru] (ちょう/ふく[れる]), to swell or bulge; mostly used in the compound , normally rewritten with  instead)
 (momme (もんめ), a unit of weight approx 3.75g)

January 7, 2015
1 kanji was added, for a total of 862 characters.

巫

September 25, 2017
1 kanji was added, for a total of 863 characters.

渾

List of jinmeiyō kanji
The list is split into two parts: 
 633 characters which do not appear in the list of jōyō kanji (regular-use kanji). 18 of these have a variant, bringing the number of character forms to 651.
 212 characters which are traditional forms (kyūjitai) of characters present in the list of jōyō kanji.

Jinmeiyō kanji not part of the jōyō kanji
Variants are given in parentheses.
丑　丞　乃　之　乎　也　云　些　亦　亥　亨　亮　仔　伊　伍　伽　佃　佑　伶　侃　侑　俄　俠　俣　俐　倭　俱　倦　倖　偲　傭　儲　允　兎　兜　其　冴　凌　凧　凪　凰　凱　函　劉　劫　勁　勺　勿　匁　匡　廿　卜　卯　卿　厨　厩　叉　叡　叢　叶　只　吾　吞　吻　哉　哨　啄　哩　喬　喧　喰　喋　嘩　嘉　嘗　噌　噂　圃　圭　坐　坦　埴　堰　堺　堵　塙　壕　壬　夷　奄　奎　套　娃　姪　姥　娩　嬉　孟　宏　宋　宕　宥　寅　寓　寵　尖　尤　屑　峨　峻　崚　嵯　嵩　嶺　巫　已　巳　巴　巷　巽　帖　幌　幡　庄　庇　庚　庵　廟　廻　弘　弛　彗　彦　彪　彬　徠　忽　怜　恢　恰　恕　悌　惟　惚　悉　惇　惹　惺　惣　慧　憐　戊　或　戟　托　按　挺　挽　掬　捲　捷　捺　捧　掠　揃　摑　摺　撒　撰　撞　播　撫　擢　孜　敦　斐　斡　斧　斯　於　旭　昂　昊　昏　昌　昴　晏　晒　晋　晟　晦　晨　智　暉　暢　曙　曝　曳　朋　朔　杏　杖　杜　李　杭　杵　杷　枇　柑　柴　柘　柊　柏　柾　柚　栞　桔　桂　栖　桐　栗　梧　梓　梢　梛　梯　桶　梶　椛　梁　棲　椋　椀　楯　楚　楕　椿　楠　楓　椰　楢　楊　榎　樺　榊　榛　槍　槌　樫　槻　樟　樋　橘　樽　橙　檎　檀　櫂　櫛　櫓　欣　欽　歎　此　殆　毅　毘　毬　汀　汝　汐　汲　沌　沓　沫　洸　洲　洵　洛　浩　浬　淵　淳　淀　淋　渥　渾　湘　湊　湛　溢　滉　溜　漱　漕　漣　澪　濡　瀕　灘　灸　灼　烏　焰　焚　煌　煤　煉　熙　燕　燎　燦　燭　燿　爾　牒　牟　牡　牽　犀　狼　獅　玖　珂　珈　珊　珀　玲　琉　瑛　琥　琶　琵　琳　瑚　瑞　瑶　瑳　瓜　瓢　甥　甫　畠　畢　疋　疏　皐　皓　眸　瞥　矩　砦　砥　砧　硯　碓　碗　碩　碧　磐　磯　祇　禽　禾　秦　秤　稀　稔　稟　稜　穹　穿　窄　窪　窺　竣　竪　竺　竿　笈　笹　笙　笠　筈　筑　箕　箔　篇　篠　簞　簾　籾　粥　粟　糊　紘　紗　紐　絃　紬　絆　絢　綺　綜　綴　緋　綾　綸　縞　徽　繫　繡　纂　纏　羚　翔　翠　耀　而　耶　耽　聡　肇　肋　肴　胤　胡　脩　腔　脹　膏　臥　舜　舵　芥　芹　芭　芙　芦　苑　茄　苔　苺　茅　茉　茸　茜　莞　荻　莫　莉　菅　菫　菖　萄　菩　萊　菱　葦　葵　萱　葺　萩　董　葡　蓑　蒔　蒐　蒼　蒲　蒙　蓉　蓮　蔭　蔣　蔦　蓬　蔓　蕎　蕨　蕉　蕃　蕪　薙　蕾　蕗　藁　薩　蘇　蘭　蝦　蝶　螺　蟬　蟹　蠟　衿　袈　袴　裡　裟　裳　襖　訊　訣　註　詢　詫　誼　諏　諄　諒　謂　諺　讃　豹　貰　賑　赳　跨　蹄　蹟　輔　輯　輿　轟　辰　辻　迂　迄　辿　迪　迦　這　逞　逗　逢　遁　遼　邑　祁　郁　鄭　酉　醇　醐　醍　醬　釉　釘　釧　銑　鋒　鋸　錘　錐　錆　錫　鍬　鎧　閃　閏　閤　阿　陀　隈　隼　雀　雁　雛　雫　霞　靖　鞄　鞍　鞘　鞠　鞭　頁　頌　頗　顚　颯　饗　馨　馴　馳　駕　駿　驍　魁　魯　鮎　鯉　鯛　鰯　鱒　鱗　鳩　鳶　鳳　鴨　鴻　鵜　鵬　鷗　鷲　鷺　鷹　麒　麟　麿　黎　黛　鼎

Below are the 18 characters that are variant forms of characters in the list above. For each variant form, the corresponding standard form ("non-variant" form) is in parentheses.

Traditional variants of jōyō kanji
The modern form (shinjitai), which appears in the Jōyō Kanji List, is given in brackets.
                                                                                                                                                                                                                   

Note that  is merely the closest Wikipedia can come to the form on the official list, where the first (top left) stroke is horizontal rather  than vertical.

Actual usage in names
Usage of the Jinmeiyō Kanji in Japanese names varies widely. For example, 之, is used in over 6000 names, and the 53 kanji used most commonly in names are all in over 500 names each.

See also

Inmyongyong chuga hanjapyo (Korean names)

External links
 List of Jōyō Kanji (Japanese Agency for Cultural Affairs)
 List of Jinmeiyō Kanji (Japanese Ministry of Justice)

References

Kanji
Japanese writing system